

Early history 

Arnoldus Pannevis proposed an Afrikaans Bible translation in 1872 in a letter to a newspaper.  The translation of the Bible which was used in the Dutch Reformed Church at the time was the Statenbijbel, and Afrikaans was not regarded as a language separate from Dutch but as a simplified version of Dutch, and all white people were expected to be able to read and understand proper Dutch anyway, and therefore Pannevis' proposal was for a translation in the "simple" Dutch used by non-whites.  Pannevis and C.P. Hoogenhout also wrote to the British and Foreign Bible Society to request such a translation, but the request was denied.

At around this time (1875) several magazines, small newspapers and other publications in Afrikaans (for speakers regardless of race) increasingly agreed with Pannevis.  The publisher of several of these decided in 1878 that an Afrikaans Bible translation must be made, and in 1885 commissioned SJ du Toit to start the translations.  These translations were completed: Genesis (1893), Gospel of Mathews (1895), Revelation (1898), and Psalms (1907).  Before his death in 1911 Du Toit was working on a translation of the Gospel of Luke.  In an Afrikaans magazine at the time, the following translations were also published: Song of Songs (1905), Acts of the Apostles (1908) and Gospel of Mark (1908).

Hoogenhout also completed a translation of the Gospel of Mark, in 1878, though this was never published.

By the 1920s opinion had changed towards Afrikaans as a language in its own right.  In 1916, the Dutch Reformed Church created a commission to investigate the possibility of an Afrikaans Bible translation.  It was originally thought that the translation should be a rewrite of the Dutch translation using Afrikaans words, and such a translation of the Gospels and Psalms (Vier Evangelië en Die Psalme) was published in 1922, but was not well received by the public.  In 1929 the same publication was published, this time in real Afrikaans, and was well received.  The translation of the full Bible was published in 1933.

Full Bible

1933, 1953 South African Bible Society 

The first official Bible translation of the entire Bible from Hebrew and Greek into Afrikaans was completed in 1933 by J. D. du Toit, E. E. van Rooyen, J. D. Kestell, H. C. M. Fourie,  and BB Keet. The Afrikaans Bible was introduced to Afrikaans-speaking Christian community during a Bible Festival in Bloemfontein, on 27 August 1933.

By the 20 year anniversary in 1953, the Afrikaans language had changed quite a bit (since the 1933 translation was translated deliberately in old-fashioned language that resembled the old Dutch Statenvertaling, to prevent it from being rejected by Christians who were used to using the Dutch translation).  The 1953 edition contained a number of small changes and changes to the spelling of names.  The 1953 edition also introduced copious cross-references that were present in all subsequent prints of that edition.

1982, Die Lewende Bybel, Christelike Uitgewersmaatskappy (CUM) 

This paraphrase was the first non-official translation of the entire Bible in Afrikaans.  It was translated in the tradition of the Living Bible from 1971, using a language and style that is very similar to it.  The Bible was translated by Du Toit van der Merwe.

1983, South African Bible Society 
The 1983 translation was intended as a faithful translation of the source text in contemporary Afrikaans. Reivisons continued until 1992. The final editors were E. P. Groenewald, A. H. van Zyl, P. A. Verhoef, J. L. Helberg, and W. Kempen.

2001, Nuwe Wêreld-vertaling van die Heilige Skrif, Watchtower Bible and Tract Society 

The Nuwe Wêreld-vertaling van die Heilige Skrif is an Afrikaans translation of the 1984 English translation of the Bible by the Watchtower Society.

2006, Nuwe Lewende Vertaling, Christelike Uitgewersmaatskappy (CUM) 

The Nuwe Lewende Vertaling (literally "New Living Translation") was published in 2006.  The previous "living translation" in Afrikaans was a paraphrase, but this version is a direct translation.  It is a backlash against dynamic equivalence and a return to a more literal translation (the same applies to the Bible Society's new direct translation).  The language in this translation sounds rather old-fashioned.

2002, 2006, Die Boodskap, Christelike Uitgewersmaatskappy (CUM) 

Following the popularity of Eugene Peterson's The Message translation, Stephan Joubert translated the New Testament in a similar idiomatic style of Afrikaans (but without the slang that characterised Peterson's translation), and gave it a similar name, that was published in 2002 as Die Boodskap.  With the assistance of Jan van der Watt, the Old Testament was translated and published in 2006, along with improvements in the New Testament translation.

Die Boodskap was recently included in the Youversion app as a downloadable version.

2002, DieBybel@Kinders.co.za, Carpe Diem Media 

The DieBybel@Kinders.co.za is a verse-by-verse translation of the Bible from the original languages, in modern, conversational Afrikaans.  It was originally written as a children's Bible, with the distinction that it was not simply a collection of Bible stories but an actual translation of the entire Bible.  The translators are Gert Prinsloo, Phil Botha, Willem Boshoff, Hennie Stander, Dirk Human, Stephan Joubert, and Jan van der Watt.

After the initial publication, the same translation was republished and rebranded for other target groups.  These editions used the same text but included additional content, layout, colours, and typography to suit the targeted audience.  The rebranded versions included Die Bybel@dogters.co.za (early-teen girls),  Die Bybel@seuns.co.za (early-teen boys),  Die Bybel@meisies.co.za (late-teen girls), Die Bybel@ouens.co.za (late-teen boys), Die Bybel@mans.co.za (adult men) and Die Bybel@vroue.co.za (adult women).  The most recent rebranding is an e-publication containing only the New Testament, called Bybel@Kinders.  An edition for teenage girls in glossary magazine format was published under the name "Glans".

2008, Bybel vir Almal, South African Bible Society 

The Bybel vir Almal was originally published as a Bible for deaf people, as it was specifically translated as a Bible for the deaf.  It is not in sign language, but in ordinary Afrikaans, with a more limited vocabulary and sensitivity to issues that deaf people may not understand.  Hearing people tend to associate certain sounds with certain emotions, but deaf people don't.  For example, hearing people associate a pastoral scene with serenity, partly due to the sounds that accompany it.  In verses where the translators were forced to use more difficult words, there are extensive explanatory footnotes that explain the words.

This translation can be read online at the South African Bible Society's web site.  The editors included Bart Oberholzer, Bernard Combrink, Hermie van Zyl, Francois Tolmie, Christo van der Merwe, Rocco Hough en Elmine Roux.

2016, Pad van Waarheid tot die Lewe (PWL), PWL Sentrum 
The Pad van Waarheid tot die Lewe translation is a verse-by-verse translation of the biblical source texts into modern Afrikaans, most notably using Aramaic sources exclusively for the New Testament. It was privately translated by Gerrie Coetzee, an ex missionary, and edited by his wife, Hanlie, and several private individuals.

The PWL translation was translated from the oldest sources freely available at the time. For the Old Testament these included: the Septuagint (LXX), Aleppo Codex, Peshitta Old Testament (POT) and the Masoretic Text. These sources were augmented by fragments found at Qumran, including the Dead Sea Scrolls (DSS). The New Testament was exclusively translated from Aramaic sources, namely the Peshitta, Khabouris and Crawford Manuscript, despite their debatable origins. This has led to a renewed debate surrounding the place of Aramaic as source material for the New Testament.

In 2016 Dr. Chris de Wet of the Department of New Testament Studies at UNISA wrote a review on the PWL translation. He was answered by Coetzee the same year in an open letter posted the PWL website.

The PWL translation is distributed free of charge in both hard copy and as downloadable PDF, theWord and eSword files.

2020, Die Bybel 2020 Edition, South African Bible Society 

A new translation by the South African Bible Society, meant to replace the 1983 translation, was released in 2020

Partial Bible

2014, Direct Translation, South African Bible Society 

In March 2014, the New Testament and Psalms from this new Bible translation was published.  Most of the Old Testament are in the final stages of translation as well.  It is intended as a very direct translation suitable for Bible study and use in churches, and is partly the Bible Society's answer to a competing Bible publisher's recent publication of a very direct translation (the Nuwe Lewende Vertaling).  The Nuwe Lewende Vertaling is widely used but not officially sanctioned by the largest Afrikaans churches of South Africa, who usually recommend to their members the translations published by the Bible Society.  This new direct translation fills that void.

The translation was done by teams of four individuals each, consisting of English-Afrikaans translators and experts in the original languages.  The draft versions of the Bible books were made available on the Bible Society's web site as PDFs, and the public was asked to comment on the translations before the final version was created.  This is the first Bible translation that involved participation of the general public in the form of commentary from non-invited parties.

2014, Afrikaans Standard Version, CUM Books 

A version of the New Testament called the "Afrikaans Standard Version" was published in 2014 as a parallel Bible with the new "Standard" translation and the New Living Translation.  It is practically a word-for-word translation, as it is based on the word-for-word Afrikaans text in the interlinear Bible that was published by CUM Books in 2012.  One of the editors of the Bible Society's Direct Translation is also an editor of the Afrikaans Standard Version.

Comparison

See also
Afrikaans literature
Bible translations by language
Religion in South Africa

References

External links
Bible Society of South Africa

Afrikaans
Afrikaans literature